This is a list of the 81 members of the European Parliament for France in the 1984 to 1989 session.

List
 Jean-Pierre Abelin
 Magdeleine Anglade
 Dominique Baudis 
 Denis Baudouin
 Charles Baur (1986–1989)
 Pierre Bernard-Reymond 
 Alain Carignon
 Roger Chinaud 
 Nicole Chouraqui 
 Alfred Coste-Floret
 Michel Debatisse
 Robert Delorozoy
 Jean-François Deniau
 Georges Donnez
 Anne-Marie Dupuy 
 André Fanton
 Gaston Flosse 
 Nicole Fontaine
 Yves Galland 
 Robert Hersant
 Alain Juppé 
 Jean Lecanuet 
 Gérard Longuet 
 Philippe Malaud
 Christian de la Malène
 Jacques Mallet
 Jean-François Mancel
 Simone Martin
 Jean Mouchel
 François Musso
 Jean-Thomas Nordmann
 Christiane Papon (1987–1989)
 Jean-Claude Pasty
 Pierre Pflimlin
 Michel Poniatowski
 Bernard Pons 
 André Rossi 
 Jean-Pierre Roux 
 Christiane Scrivener 
 Jacqueline Thome-Patenotre
 Simone Veil
 Jacques Vernier
 Claude Wolff
 Jean-Paul Bachy 
 Jean Besse
 Alain Bombard
 Gisèle Charzat
 Jean-Pierre Cot
 Louis Eyraud
 Roger Fajardie 
 Léon Fatous
 Yvette Fuillet
 Colette Gadioux
 Max Gallo
 Lionel Jospin 
 Marie-Noëlle Lienemann 
 Charles-Emile Loo
 Didier Motchane 
 Nicole Pery
 Henri Saby
 Georges Sutra de Germa
 Bernard Thareau
 Marie-Claude Vayssade
 Robert Chambeiron
 Danielle De March-Ronco
 Maxime Gremetz 
 Jacqueline Hoffmann 
 Emmanuel Maffre-Baugé
 Georges Marchais
 René-Emile Piquet
 Pierre-Benjamin Pranchère
 Paul Vergès
 Francis Wurtz
 Bernard Antony
 Michel de Camaret
 Dominique Chaboche 
 Michel Collinot
 Jean-Marie Le Chevallier
 Martine Lehideux
 Jean-Marie Le Pen
 Olivier Lefevre d'Ormesson
 Gustave Pordea
 Jean-Pierre Stirbois

References 

1984
List
France